Cooperative Engagement Capability (CEC) is a sensor network with integrated fire control capability that is intended to significantly improve battle force air and missile defense capabilities by combining data from multiple battle force air search sensors on CEC-equipped units into a single, real-time, composite track picture (network-centric warfare).  This will greatly enhance fleet air defense by making jamming more difficult and allocating defensive missiles on a battle group basis.

Development

Origins of the US Navy program 
The CEC concept was conceived by Johns Hopkins applied physics laboratory in the early 1970s. The concept was  originally called Battle Group Anti-Air Warfare (AAW) Coordination. The first critical at-sea experiment with a system prototype occurred in 1990. The CEC became a Navy acquisition program in 1992.

United States

NIFC-CA 
In the future, CEC will form a key pillar of the Naval Integrated Fire Control-Counter Air (NIFC-CA) capability, which will allow stealthy sensor platforms such as the F-35C Lightning II to act as forward observers with their observations channeled through the E-2D Advanced Hawkeye to less stealthy platforms such as the UCLASS or Boeing F/A-18E/F Super Hornet.

In a combat situation where the United States Navy would need to penetrate an anti-access/area denial (A2/AD) environment, a carrier air wing would launch all of its aircraft.  The F-35C would use its stealth to fly deep into enemy airspace and use its sensors to gather intelligence, surveillance, and reconnaissance (ISR) data.  The EA-18G Growler would use the Next Generation Jammer to provide stand-off jamming or at least degradation of early warning radars.  When targets are detected by the F-35C, they would transmit weapons-quality track to the E-2D and pass that information on to Super Hornets or other F-35Cs.  The F/A-18E/F fighters would penetrate as far as they could into heavily contested airspace, which is still further than an ordinary fourth-generation jet fighter, then launch stand-off weapons.  The UCLASS would use aerial refueling capabilities to extend the range of the strike force and use its own ISR sensors.

NIFC-CA relies on the use of data-links to provide every aircraft and ship with a picture of the entire battlespace.  Aircraft deploying weapons may not need to control missiles after releasing them, as an E-2D would guide them by a data-stream to the target.  Other aircraft are also capable of guiding missiles from other aircraft to any target that is identified as long as they are in range; work on weapons that are more survivable and longer-ranged is underway to increase their effectiveness in the data-link-centric battle strategy.  This can allow forward-deployed Super Hornets or Lightning IIs to receive data and launch weapons without needing to even have their own radars active.  E-2Ds act as the central node of NIFC-CA to connect the strike group with the carrier, but every aircraft is connected to all others through their own links.  Two Advanced Hawkeyes would move data using the tactical targeting network technology (TTNT) waveform to share vast amounts of data over long distances with very low latency.  Other aircraft would be connected to the E-2D through Link 16 or concurrent multi-netting-4 (CMN-4), a variant of four Link 16 radio receivers "stacked up" on top of each other.  Growlers would coordinate with each other using data-links to locate hostile radar emitters on land or on the ocean surface.  Having several sensors widely dispersed also hardens the system to electronic warfare; all cannot be jammed, so the parts that are not can home in on the jamming energy and target it for destruction.  The network is built with redundancy to make it difficult to jam over a broad geographic area.  If an enemy tries to disrupt it by targeting space-based communications, a line-of-sight network can be created.

Cooperative engagement also applies to ship-based protective features where Aegis radars of guided missile cruisers and destroyers are linked together into a single network to share data as a whole.  This allows targets detected by one ship, as well as those seen by aircraft, to be identified by another ship and fired upon with long-range missiles like the Standard Missile 6 (SM-6) without that vessel having to actually detect it themselves.  Not needing to fire on targets only once a ship's own sensors see them allows for shorter time needed to shoot, increased standoff distance to begin firing, and enables a whole fleet to intercept threats, like high-speed cruise missiles, once only a single ship sees them.

On September 12, 2016 Lockheed used a separate ground station to relay the F-35's Multi-Function Advanced Data Link (MADL) targeting data to an Aegis system for a SM-6 launch.

Potential countermeasures 
There is serious concern among the U.S. Navy that key parts of the CEC can be countered by sophisticated electronics.  Russian and Chinese advancements in low-frequency radars are increasingly able to detect stealth aircraft; fighters like the F-22 Raptor and F-35 are optimized to avoid detection from higher frequencies in the Ku, X, C, and parts of the S bands, but not from longer wavelengths like L, UHF, and VHF.  Previously these bands might see stealth aircraft but not clearly enough to generate a missile lock, but with improved computing power, fire control radars could discern targets more precisely by the 2020s or 2030s.  Warships like the Chinese Type 52C Luyang II and Type 52D Luyang III have both high and low-frequency radars to find aircraft detectable by both wavelength ranges.  This would make it difficult for the Navy F-35C to survive in a low-frequency radar environment.  The entire NIFC-CA concept is also vulnerable to cyber warfare and electronic attacks, which would be used to disrupt the system reliant on data-links.  Long-range anti-radiation missiles can threaten the radar-equipped E-2D, the central node of the NIFC-CA network.  These threats may give impetus to calls for building the UCLASS as an all-aspect broadband stealth aircraft.

It is feared that the stealth F-35C could be targeted by low-frequency radar-guided missiles, like during the 1999 downing of an F-117 Nighthawk. In that incident, the F-117 Nighthawk became the first stealth plane to be shot down when it was hit by an SA-3 Goa. The creation of digital AESA VHF acquisition radars, including the Russian ground-based 3D Nebo SVU and Chinese ship-borne Type 517M, offering detection at greater ranges, faster and more accurate cueing of engagement radars, enhanced resistance to jamming, and improved mobility contribute to the perceived vulnerability of small stealth fighters.

Several important factors made the intercept in 1999 possible, including engagement radars being active for no more than 20 seconds to avoid location by NATO electronic warfare aircraft, and the use of decoys and frequent movement of the missile battery to make it difficult for NATO suppression of enemy air defenses (SEAD) aircraft to locate and target it.  Poor operational discipline on the US's part also contributed, including the F-117 flying the same flight path on different missions, communicating on unencrypted channels that could be (and were) monitored by hostile forces, and the absence of standoff electronic warfare support aircraft to be properly aligned with enemy radars to support a stealth intrusion.

The F-35C was designed for network-centric warfare, and gives the pilot enhanced situational awareness from its ability to communicate and process data obtained from onboard sensors and from other platforms.  While the F-117 had no radar, the F-35C uses an AN/APG-81 AESA radar that can act as a narrowband jammer and can be used against engagement radars.  Under NIFC-CA, F-35Cs will routinely be supported by Growlers and Super Hornets to jam and destroy enemy targets beyond the range of surface-to-air missiles.  Data-links used to share information are high-bandwidth and jam-resistant to maintain contact.  The Navy would also work with the United States Air Force in an attack, with the Navy using the EA-18G as a dedicated EW platform in contested airspace, and the Air Force contributing other stealth platforms including the B-2 Spirit, Long Range Strike Bomber (LRS-B), and future stealthy unmanned combat aerial vehicles (UCAVs); those platforms have, or are planned to have, wideband stealth using geometrical features such as large size and a tailless configuration to enable them to stay undetected when confronted by VHF radars.  Even with the possibility of cyber and electronic attack to hack or jam data-links, passive detection systems to locate aircraft based on their electronic emissions, and long-range anti-radiation missiles, the flexibility of "network-centric" cooperative engagement concepts allows additional systems and platforms to be "plugged or unplugged" as required, offering increased survivability and growth potential for new methods of countering countermeasures to be integrated into new or existing concepts.

France 
France has developed its own CEC system tenue de situation multi plateformes (TSMPF)

India 
On 15 May 2019, the Indian Navy became the second service in the world after the United States, and the first in Asia, to have developed the capability, by conducting the maiden cooperative engagement firing of the Barak 8. The firing was undertaken on the Western Seaboard by 2 Kolkata-class destroyers,  and  wherein the missiles of both ships were controlled by one ship to intercept different aerial targets at extended ranges. The trial was carried out by the Indian Navy, DRDO and Israel Aerospace Industries. The capability would be rolled out on all future major warships of the Indian Navy.

The test employed the full Joint Taskforce Coordination (JTC) mode which implements the Barak 8 ‘Cooperative Engagement’ operating mode. The trial comprised two complex scenarios involving multiple platforms and several simultaneous targets.

The destroyers detected multiple targets using their EL/M-2248 MF-STAR radars and launched several missiles at those targets. What was different was that only one of the ships controlled the engagement, intercepting different aerial targets at extended ranges by the missiles fired from both ships using the systems’ JTC mode. The test demonstrated the ability of MRSAM to operate wide area air defense, distributing assets and control over different platforms and locations. Previous MRSAM firing trials were conducted on a single platform, in the stand-alone mode.

Japan 
In a Joint test, Japan's Cooperative Engagement Capability  allowed  to detect and track a ballistic missile;  shot it down.

See also 
 Global Information Grid
 Ship Self-Defense System

References

External links 

Equipment of the United States Navy
Anti-aircraft warfare